Jolanta Łukaszewicz (born June 16, 1966 in Choszczno) is a Polish sprint canoer who competed in the late 1980s. At the 1988 Summer Olympics in Seoul, she finished eighth in the K-4 500 m event and ninth in the K-2 500 m event.

References
 Sports-reference.com profile

1966 births
Canoeists at the 1988 Summer Olympics
Living people
Olympic canoeists of Poland
Polish female canoeists
People from Choszczno County
Sportspeople from West Pomeranian Voivodeship